The 2008–09 Western Kentucky Hilltoppers men's basketball team represented Western Kentucky University during the 2008–09 NCAA Division I men's basketball season. The Hilltoppers were led by first year head coach Ken McDonald and team captain Orlando Mendez-Valdez. They played their home games at E. A. Diddle Arena and were members of the East Division of the Sun Belt Conference. They finished the season 25–9 and 15–3 in Sun Belt Play to finish first in the East Division.  One of the highlights of the season was a victory over in-state rival, 3rd ranked Louisville.  The Hilltoppers won the Sun Belt Basketball tournament and earned the conference's automatic bid to the NCAA tournament. They defeated Illinois in the first round before falling tenth ranked Gonzaga.
Mendez-Valdez was SBC Player of the year and was joined by A.J. Slaughter on the All SBC team.  Slaughter was SBC Tournament Most Valuable Player and was joined on the All-Tournament team by Mendaz-Valdez and Sergio Kerusch.

Schedule

|-
!colspan=6| Regular Season
 
|-

|-
!colspan=6| 2009 Sun Belt Conference men's basketball tournament

|-
!colspan=6| 2009 NCAA Division I men's basketball tournament

References

Western Kentucky Hilltoppers basketball seasons
WKU
WKU